Kelsey Alaine Merritt (born October 1, 1996) is a Filipino-American model best known for being the first Filipino to walk in the Victoria's Secret Fashion Show and to appear in the pages of the Sports Illustrated Swimsuit Issue.

Early life and education 
Merritt was born on October 1, 1996, in Angeles City, Pampanga, Philippines to a Filipina mother and American father of French, German, British and Irish descent. In May 2017, she graduated from Ateneo de Manila University in Quezon City, Metro Manila, with a degree in communications. She has been modelling in the Philippines from a young age and is currently based in New York City.

Career 
During her career in the Philippines, she did commercials with Palmolive, San Miguel Light, clothing brand Kashieca, and posed for numerous magazine covers. 
After finishing her studies she moved to New York where she signed with Wilhelmina.
On October 9, 2019, Kelsey posted on her Instagram that she signed with her new management, The Society in New York City.

In 2018, she walked for in the Victoria's Secret Fashion Show in New York and was announced to be the first Filipino-American model to walk the runway.
It was also her first ever runway show.

She was featured in the pages of the 2019 Sports Illustrated Swimsuit Issue.

On June 13, 2020, she signed her contract with the Viva Artists Agency.

References

External links

1996 births
Living people
Victoria's Secret
Filipino female models
Filipino people of American descent
Filipino people of British descent
Filipino people of French descent
Filipino people of German descent
Filipino people of Irish descent
Ateneo de Manila University alumni
American female models
American people of British descent
American models of Filipino descent
American people of French descent
American people of German descent
American people of Irish descent
Filipino expatriates in the United States
Kapampangan people
The Society Management models
Viva Artists Agency